Diable Bay is a small, open bay on the island of Newfoundland in the province of Newfoundland and Labrador, Canada. The settlement of L'Anse-au-Diable was close by.

References
 This article includes text incorporated from United States Hydrographic Office & R. G. Davenport's "Newfoundland and Labrador: The coast and banks of Newfoundland and the coast of Labrador, from Grand Point to the Koksoak River, with the adjacent islands and banks" (1884), a publication now in the public domain.

Bays of Newfoundland and Labrador